Gordian the Tyrant (German: Gordian, der Tyrann) is a 1937 German comedy film directed by Fred Sauer and starring Weiß Ferdl, Paul Richter and Michael von Newlinsky.

The film's sets were designed by the art director Karl Böhm and Erich Czerwonski. Location shooting took place around Wasserburg in Bavaria.

Synopsis
A small-town official in pre-Weimar Germany stands in opposition to any progress in the area. Complications arise when his doppelganger, a theatrical impresario, arrives in the area.

Cast
 Weiß Ferdl as Landeshauptmann Gordian von Schwingenbeutel / Theaterdirektor Ferdinand 
 Paul Richter as Fürst 
 Michael von Newlinsky as Adjutant des Fürsten 
 Trude Haefelin as Gordians Nichte Franziska 
 Ellen Hille as Gordians Dienstmädchen Vroni 
 Fred Doederlein as Assessor Hans von Planck 
 Josef Eichheim as Amtsdiener Högl 
 Leo Peukert as Sanitätsrat Dr. Sterzinger 
 Marlise Ludwig as Resede Silbernagel 
 Irene Andor as Wirtin Toni 
 Olga Schaub as Kellnerin 
 Maria Hofen as Nachbarin 
 Hanns Waschatko as Stammgast 
 Josef Dischner as Stammgast

References

Bibliography 
 Waldman, Harry. Nazi Films in America, 1933-1942. McFarland, 2008.

External links
 

1937 films
Films of Nazi Germany
1930s German-language films
Films directed by Fred Sauer
1937 comedy films
German comedy films
Tobis Film films
German black-and-white films
1930s German films